The 1916 North Carolina gubernatorial election was held on November 7, 1916. Democratic nominee Thomas Walter Bickett defeated Republican nominee Frank A. Linney with 58.15% of the vote. At the time, Bickett was the state's Attorney General, while Linney was an attorney and chairman of the North Carolina Republican Party.

Primary elections
Primary elections were held on June 3, 1916.

Democratic primary

Candidates
Thomas Walter Bickett, North Carolina Attorney General
Elijah L. Daughtridge, incumbent Lieutenant Governor

Results

General election

Candidates
Major party candidates
Thomas Walter Bickett, Democratic
Frank A. Linney, Republican

Other candidates
Leonhard Miller, Socialist

Results

References

1916
North Carolina
Gubernatorial